Cão! was the first studio album by Portuguese rock band Ornatos Violeta, released on 15 September 1997 by Polygram. Three singles were released from this album: "Punk Moda Funk", "A Dama do Sinal" and "Mata-me Outra Vez".

Reception
In 2009, Cão! was named by Blitz as the 5th best album released by a Portuguese band in the 90's. The album was also included in the same publication's list of the best albums recorded by bands from the city of Porto, along works by artists such as GNR, Rui Veloso and Blind Zero.

Track listing

References

External links 
 Lyrics for Cão!

1997 debut albums
Ornatos Violeta albums
Portuguese-language albums